Oakwood Aerodrome  is a registered aerodrome located  southwest of Oakwood, Ontario, Canada.

References

Buildings and structures in Kawartha Lakes
Registered aerodromes in Ontario